The following is a list of mayors of the city of Santos, in São Paulo state, Brazil.

 Francisco Correa de Almeida Morais, 1891	
 Antonio Carlos da Silva Teles, 1891	
 Manoel Maria Tourinho, 1892-1896	
 Jacob Thomaz Itapura de Miranda, 1896	
 Narciso de Andrade, 1896-1897	
 Antonio José Malheiros Júnior, 1897-1898	
 Joaquim Montenegro, 1898-1899	
 José Moreira de Sampaio, 1899-1899	
 Adolpho Vaz Guimarães, 1899-1902	
 Francisco Malta Cardoso, 1902-1904	
 Manoel Galeão Carvalhal, 1904-1905, 1916-1917
 João Galeão Carvalhal, 1905	
 Joaquim Mariano de Campos Moura, 1905-1906	
 Carlos Augusto Vasconcelos Tavares, 1906-1907, 1908-1910
 Cincinato Martins Costa, 1907-1908	
 , 1910-1914, 1917-1920	
 Carlos Luiz de Afonseca, 1914-1916	 
 Joaquim Montenegro, 1920-1925
 Arnaldo Ferreira de Aguiar, 1925-1926	
 José de Souza Dantas, 1929-1930	 
 Elias Machado de Almeida, 1930-1931	
 Antenor Maciel Bué, 1931-1932	
 Aristides Bastos Machado, 1932-1935, 1936	
 Antonio Gomide Ribeiro dos Santos, 1935-1936, 1938, 1941-1945
 Antônio Iguatemi Martins Júnior, 1936-1938	 
 Cyro de Athayde Carneiro, 1938-1941	
 Lincoln Feliciano, 1945	
 Francisco Paíno, 1945, 1947
 Edgard Boaventura, 1946-1947	
 Ozório de Souza Leite, 1947		
 Rubens Ferreira Martins	, 1947-1948, 1949-1950
 Álvaro Rodrigues dos Santos, 1948-1949	
 Hernani Botto de Barros, 1950	
 Sócrates Aranha de Menezes, 1950-1951	
 Joaquim Alcaide Valls, 1951-1952	
 Francisco Luiz Ribeiro, 1951-1953	
 Antonio Ezequiel Feliciano da Silva, 1953-1957	
 Sílvio Fernandes Lopes, 1957-1961	
 Luiz La Scala Júnior, 1961	 
 José Gomes, 1961-1962, 1962-1964	
 Fernando Oliva, 1962	
 Fernando Hortalla Ridel, 1964-1965
 Sílvio Fernandes Lopes, 1965-1967, 1967-1969	
 Francisco Prado de Oliveira Filho, 1967	
 Clóvis Bandeira Brasil, 1969-1972, 1972-1974	
 Ruy Vidal de Araújo, 1972
 Antônio Manoel de Carvalho, 1974-1979	
 , 1979-1980	
 , 1980	
 , 1980-1984	
 , 1984-1988	
 , 1989-1992	
 , 1993-1996	
 , 1997-2004	
 , 2005-2012	
 , 2013-

See also
  (city council)
 
 List of mayors of largest cities in Brazil (in Portuguese)

References

This article incorporates information from the Portuguese Wikipedia.

santos
Santos, São Paulo